Phrynopus bufoides is a species of frog in the family Strabomantidae.
It is endemic to Peru.
Its natural habitat is subtropical or tropical high-altitude shrubland.

References

bufoides
Amphibians of the Andes
Amphibians of Peru
Endemic fauna of Peru
Taxonomy articles created by Polbot
Amphibians described in 2005